Marina Olegovna Zoueva or Zueva (born 9 April 1956) is a Russian figure skating coach, choreographer, and former competitor in ice dancing. Representing the Soviet Union with Andrei Vitman, she placed 5th at the 1977 World Championships and won two medals at Skate Canada International. She has coached a number of skaters to Olympic medals, including Ekaterina Gordeeva / Sergei Grinkov (gold in 1994), Tessa Virtue / Scott Moir (gold in 2010), Meryl Davis / Charlie White (gold in 2014), and Maia Shibutani / Alex Shibutani (bronze in 2018).

Career

As a competitor 

Zoueva competed for the Soviet Union as an ice dancer with partner Andrei Vitman. They won two national bronze medals at the Soviet Championships. They finished fifth at the 1977 European and World Championships. The next season, they were sixth at the 1978 European Championships and seventh at the World Championships.

As a coach and choreographer 
Zoueva retired from ice dancing at the end of the 1970s to become a choreographer. Her final assignment toward receiving her choreography degree at the National Theatre Institute in Moscow in 1982 was the creation of a routine for Ekaterina Gordeeva and Sergei Grinkov. Throughout the 1980s, she continued to choreograph for this elite pair, creating their programs to Moonlight Sonata, Vocalise, and Romeo and Juliet. In 1993, Gordeeva and Grinkov hired Zoueva to work with them again on their 1994 Olympics routines, and their collaboration continued until Grinkov's death in late 1995. Zueva then choreographed most of Gordeeva's solo programs through 2000.

Zoueva left Russia in 1991 to work as a coach and choreographer in North America. She coached at the Arctic Figure Skating Club in Canton, Michigan, as part of the International Skating Academy. In 2001, she began a coaching partnership with Igor Shpilband. On 3 June 2012, she confirmed that they were no longer working together. In January 2019, she announced that she had relocated the International Skating Academy to the Hertz Arena in Estero, Florida.
Zoueva has coached the following skaters:
 Maia Shibutani / Alex Shibutani
 Gracie Gold
 Chloe Lewis / Logan Bye
 Taylor Tran / Saulius Ambrulevičius
 Kimberley Hew-Low / Timothy McKernan
 Patrick Chan
 Nathan Chen (with Rafael Arutyunyan)
 Tessa Virtue / Scott Moir
 Meryl Davis / Charlie White
Katherine Copely / Deividas Stagniūnas
Charlotte Lichtman / Dean Copely
 Tanith Belbin / Benjamin Agosto
 Anna Cappellini / Luca Lanotte
 Madison Chock / Greg Zuerlein
 Madison Chock / Evan Bates
 Jana Khokhlova / Fedor Andreev
 Victoria Sinitsina / Nikita Katsalapov
 Kavita Lorenz / Joti Polizoakis
 Kana Muramoto / Chris Reed
 Evgenia Tarasova/ Vladimir Morozov
 Kana Muramoto / Daisuke Takahashi
 Ekaterina Gordeeva / Sergei Grinkov

Her choreography clients have included Sasha Cohen, Marin Honda, Takahiko Kozuka, Yukari Nakano, Alissa Czisny, John Coughlin, and Yulia Lipnitskaya.

Personal life 
Zoueva was born on 9 April 1956. She is the mother of Fedor Andreev – born 2 March 1982 in Moscow – who competed for Canada as a singles skater and Russia as an ice dancer. She is a naturalized Canadian citizen but works mainly in the United States. Zueva was formerly married to Alexei Tchetverukhin. She holds a master's degree of physical science from Saint Petersburg State University.

References

External links

 Skatabase: 1970s Worlds Results
 Skatabase: 1980s Worlds Results

Russian figure skating coaches
Canadian figure skating coaches
Soviet female ice dancers
People from Canton, Michigan
Figure skating choreographers
Living people
Russian expatriates in Canada
Russian expatriates in the United States
1956 births
Saint Petersburg State University alumni
Naturalized citizens of Canada
Female sports coaches